The 2014–15 Omaha Mavericks men's basketball team represented the University of Nebraska Omaha during the 2014–15 NCAA Division I men's basketball season. The Mavericks, led by tenth year head coach Derrin Hansen, played their home games at the Ralston Arena and were members of The Summit League. As part of their transition from Division II to Division I, they were ineligible for the NCAA Tournament, and thus The Summit League Tournament because its champion receives an NCAA Tournament bid. They finished the season 12–17, 5–11 in Summit League play to finish in 8th place.

This was the Mavericks' final season at Ralston Arena. The team moved to the new on-campus Baxter Arena in fall 2015.

Roster

Schedule

|-
!colspan=9 style="background:#000000; color:#cc0000;"| Regular season

References

Omaha Mavericks men's basketball seasons
Omaha
Omaha Mavericks men's basketball team
Omaha Mavericks men's basketball team